Iareonycha is a genus of longhorn beetles of the subfamily Lamiinae, containing the following species:

 Iareonycha albisterna Martins & Galileo, 2004
 Iareonycha ipepuna Martins & Galileo, 1997

References

Hemilophini